Curtis DuBois Fuller (December 15, 1932May 8, 2021) was an American jazz trombonist. He was a member of Art Blakey's Jazz Messengers and contributed to many classic jazz recordings.

Early life
Fuller was born in Detroit on December 15, 1932. His father had emigrated from Jamaica and worked in a Ford automobile factory, but he died from tuberculosis before his son was born. His mother, who had moved north from Atlanta, died when he was 9. He spent several years in an orphanage run by Jesuits.  He developed a passion for jazz after one of the nuns there brought him to see Illinois Jacquet and his band perform, with J. J. Johnson on trombone.

Fuller attended a public school in his hometown, together with Paul Chambers, Donald Byrd, Tommy Flanagan, Thad Jones, and Milt Jackson.  There, he took up the trombone when he was sixteen, after attempting the violin and with the saxophone (his next choice) being unavailable.  He studied under Johnson and Elmer James.

Career
Fuller joined the US Army in 1953 to fight in the Korean War.  He served until 1955, and played in a band with Chambers and brothers Cannonball and Nat Adderley.  Upon his return from military service, Fuller joined the quintet of Yusef Lateef, another Detroit musician. The quintet moved to New York in 1957, and Fuller recorded his first sessions as a leader with Prestige.

Alfred Lion of Blue Note Records first heard Fuller playing with Miles Davis in the late 1950s, and the trombonist led four dates for Blue Note, though one of these, an album with Slide Hampton, was not issued for many years.  Lion featured him as a sideman on record dates led by Sonny Clark (Dial "S" for Sonny, Sonny's Crib) and John Coltrane (Blue Train).  Other sideman appearances over the next decade included work on albums under the leadership of Bud Powell, Jimmy Smith, Wayne Shorter, Lee Morgan and Joe Henderson (a former roommate at Wayne State University in 1956).

Fuller was also the first trombonist to be a member of the Art Farmer-Benny Golson Jazztet, later becoming the sixth man in Art Blakey's Jazz Messengers in 1961, staying with Blakey until 1965.  In the early 1960s, Fuller recorded two albums as a leader for Impulse! Records, having also recorded for Savoy Records, United Artists, and Epic after his obligations to Blue Note had ended.  In the late 1960s, he was part of Dizzy Gillespie's band that also featured Foster Elliott.  Fuller went on to tour with Count Basie and also reunited with Blakey and Golson.

Later life
Fuller married Catherine Rose Driscoll in 1980.  She died of lung cancer in 2010; Fuller recorded his album The Story of Cathy & Me (2011) as a tribute.

Fuller was granted an honorary doctorate of music from Berklee College of Music in 1999.  Eight years later, he was honored as an NEA Jazz Master.  He continued to perform and record, and was a faculty member of the New York State Summer School of the Arts (NYSSSA) School of Jazz Studies (SJS). 

Fuller died on May 8, 2021, at the age of 88. Throughout his life, Fuller was reported to have been born in 1934; he had added two years to his age at 17 in part to gain work.

Discography

As leader

 New Trombone (Prestige, 1957)
 Bone & Bari (Blue Note, 1957)
 The Opener (Blue Note, 1957)
 Jazz ...It's Magic! (Regent, 1958)
 The Curtis Fuller Jazztet (Savoy, 1959)
 Sliding Easy (United Artists, 1959)
 Blues-ette (Savoy, 1959)
 Curtis Fuller Volume 3 (Blue Note, 1961)
 South American Cookin' (Epic, 1961)
 The Magnificent Trombone of Curtis Fuller (Epic, 1961)
 Boss of the Soul-Stream Trombone (Warwick, 1961)
 Images of Curtis Fuller (Savoy, 1962)
 Curtis Fuller with Red Garland (New Jazz, 1963)
 Cabin in the Sky (Impulse!, 1962)
 Jazz Conference Abroad (Smash, 1961 [1962])
 Soul Trombone (Impulse!, 1962)
 Imagination (Savoy, 1963)
 Curtis Fuller and Hampton Hawes with French Horns (Status, 1965)
 Smokin' (Mainstream, 1972)
 Crankin' (Mainstream, 1973)
 Fire and Filigree (Bee Hive, 1979)
 Two Bones (Blue Note, 1980)
 Curtis Fuller Meets Roma Jazz Trio (Timeless, 1984)
 Up Jumped Spring (Delmark, 2004)
 Keep It Simple (Savant, 2005)
 I Will Tell Her (Capri, 2010)
The Story of Cathy & Me (2011)
 Down Home (Capri, 2012)
 In New Orleans (Progressive, 2018)

As sideman 

With Count Basie
 Basie Big Band (Pablo, 1975)
 I Told You So (Pablo, 1976)
 Prime Time (Pablo, 1977)
 Fun Time (Pablo, 1991) – rec. 1975

With Dave Bailey
 One Foot in the Gutter (Epic, 1960)
 Gettin' Into Somethin' (Epic, 1960)
 Bash! (Jazzline, 1961)/Modern Mainstream (Fontana, 1963)

With Art Blakey
 Art Blakey!!!!! Jazz Messengers!!!!! (Impulse!, 1961)
 Mosaic (Blue Note, 1961)
 Three Blind Mice (United Artists, 1962)
 Caravan (Riverside, 1962)
 Ugetsu (Riverside, 1963)
 The African Beat (Blue Note, 1962)
 Buhaina's Delight (Blue Note, 1963)
 Golden Boy (Colpix, 1963)
 Free For All (Blue Note, 1965)
 'S Make It (Limelight, 1965)
 Indestructible (Blue Note, 1966)
 Kyoto (Riverside, 1966)
 Thermo (Milestone, 1973)
 In My Prime Vol. 1 (Timeless, 1978)

 Live at the Renaissance Club (Blue Note, 1978)
 Live Messengers (Blue Note, 1978)

With Sonny Clark
 Dial "S" for Sonny (Blue Note, 1957)
 Sonny's Crib (Blue Note, 1958)

With John Coltrane
 Blue Train (Blue Note, 1958)
 Tanganyika Strut (Savoy, 1958) Coltrane co-led with Wilbur Harden
 Jazz Way Out (Savoy, 1958) as for Tanganyika Strut
 Dial Africa: The Savoy Sessions (Savoy, 1977) reissue of the 1958 Savoy sessions
 Gold Coast (Savoy, 1978) – rec. 1958

With Kenny Dorham
 This Is the Moment (Riverside, 1958)
 Hot Stuff from Brazil (West Wind, 1988)

With Art Farmer
 Brass Shout (United Artists, 1959)
 Meet the Jazztet (Argo, 1960)
 Jazztet, Back to the City (Contemporary, 1986)
 Jazztet, Real Time (Contemporary, 1988)

With Joe Farnsworth
 It's Prime Time (Eighty-Eight's, 2003)
 Drumspeak (Commodore, 2006)

With Benny Golson
 Groovin' with Golson (New Jazz, 1959)
 The Other Side of Benny Golson (Riverside, 1959)
 Gone with Golson (New Jazz, 1960)
 Gettin' with It (New Jazz, 1960)
 Take a Number from 1 to 10 (Argo, 1961)
 Pop + Jazz = Swing (Audio Fidelity, 1962)/Just Jazz! (Audio Fidelity, 1965)
 California Message (Baystate, 1981) 
 One More Mem'ry (Baystate, 1982)

With Lionel Hampton
 Hamp in Haarlem (Timeless, 1979)
 Live in Europe (Elite Special, 1980)
 Outrageous (Glad-Hamp, 1982)

With Jimmy Heath
 The Thumper (Riverside, 1960)
 Love and Understanding  (Muse, 1973)
 Fast Company (Milestone, 1975)
 The Time and the Place (Landmark, 1994)

With Joe Henderson
 Mode for Joe (Blue Note, 1966)
 In Pursuit of Blackness (Milestone, 1971)

With Freddie Hubbard
 The Artistry of Freddie Hubbard (Impulse!, 1963)
 The Body & the Soul (Impulse!, 1963)

With Philly Joe Jones
 Drums Around the World (Riverside, 1959)
 Together! (Atlantic, 1964)

With Quincy Jones

 Newport '61 (Mercury, 1961)
 The Quintessence (Impulse!, 1962)

With Yusef Lateef
 Jazz for the Thinker (Savoy, 1957) 
 Stable Mates (Savoy, 1957)
 Jazz Mood (Savoy, 1957)
 Before Dawn: The Music of Yusef Lateef (Verve, 1957)
 The Centaur and the Phoenix (Riverside, 1960)

With Mike Longo
 The Awakening (Mainstream, 1972)
 New York '78 (Consolidated Artists, 1996)

With Machito
 With Flute to Boot (Roulette, 1959)
 Latin Soul Plus Jazz (Caliente, 1973)

With Blue Mitchell
 Big 6 (Riverside, 1958)
 Blue Soul (Riverside, 1959)

With Jackie McLean
 Makin' the Changes (New Jazz, 1960)
 A Long Drink of the Blues (New Jazz, 1961)

With Hank Mobley
 Monday Night at Birdland (Roulette, 1959)
 Another Monday Night at Birdland (Roulette, 1959)
 A Caddy for Daddy (Blue Note, 1966)

With Lee Morgan
 City Lights (Blue Note, 1957)
 Tom Cat (Blue Note, 1980)

With Woody Shaw
 Woody III (Columbia, 1979)
 For Sure! (Columbia, 1980)
 Rosewood (Columbia, 1977 [1978])

With Jimmy Smith
 House Party (Blue Note, 1957 [1958])
 Confirmation (Blue Note, 1979)
 Special Guests (Blue Note, 1984)

With Stanley Turrentine
 The Sugar Man (CTI, 1975)
 In Memory Of (Blue Note, 1979)

With Cedar Walton
 Eastern Rebellion 3 (Timeless, 1980)
 Cedar's Blues (Red, 1985)

With others
 Ahmed Abdul-Malik, East Meets West (RCA Victor, 1960)
 Walter Bishop Jr., Cubicle (Muse, 1978)
 Bob Brookmeyer, Jazz Is a Kick (Mercury, 1960)
 Paul Chambers, 1st Bassman (Vee Jay, 1960)
 Willis Conover, Jazz Committee for Latin American Affairs (FM, 1963)
 Buddy DeFranco, Blues Bag (Vee Jay, 1965)
 Lou Donaldson, Lou Takes Off (Blue Note, 1958)
 Gil Evans, Great Jazz Standards (World Pacific, 1959)
 Tommy Flanagan, Trio and Sextet (Onyx, 1973)
 Dizzy Gillespie, The Dizzy Gillespie Reunion Big Band (MPS, 1969)
 Dexter Gordon, Great Encounters (Columbia, 1979)
 Johnny Griffin, The Cat (Antilles, 1991)
 Slide Hampton, World of Trombones (West 54, 1979)
 Wilbur Harden, Jazz Way Out (Savoy, 1958)
 Hampton Hawes, Baritones and French Horns (Prestige, 1957)
 Albert Heath, Kwanza (The First) (Muse, 1974)
 John Jenkins, Jazz Eyes (Regent, 1957)
 Cliff Jordan, Cliff Jordan (Blue Note, 1957)
 Abbey Lincoln, It's Magic (Riverside, 1958)
 Booker Little, New York Sessions (Lone Hill, 2004)
 Gary McFarland, Today (Skye, 1970)
 David "Fathead" Newman, Song for the New Man (HighNote, 2004)
 David "Fathead" Newman, Diamondhead (HighNote, 2008)
 Judy Niemack, Blue Bop (Free Lance, 1989)
 Cecil Payne, Bright Moments (Spotlite, 1980)
 Houston Person, Blue Odyssey (Prestige, 1968)
 Bud Powell, Bud! The Amazing Bud Powell (Vol. 3) (Blue Note, 1957)
 Paul Quinichette, On the Sunny Side (Prestige, 1957)
 Wayne Shorter, Schizophrenia (Blue Note, 1969)
 Mickey Tucker, Theme for a Woogie-Boogie (Denon, 1979)
 Bobby Watson, All Because of You (Roulette, 1978)
 Frank Wess, Opus de Blues (Savoy, 1984)
 Ernie Wilkins, K.A.L.E.I.D.O.D.U.K.E  (Birdology, 1994)
 Kai Winding and Curtis Fuller, Giant Bones '80 (Sonet, 1980)
 Phil Woods, Rights of Swing (Candid, 1961)

References

External links
 
 

1932 births
2021 deaths
Jazz musicians from Michigan
Musicians from Detroit
21st-century trombonists
American jazz trombonists
American male jazz musicians
American musicians of Jamaican descent
Count Basie Orchestra members
Hard bop trombonists
Mainstream jazz trombonists
Male trombonists
The Jazz Messengers members
The Jazztet members
Wayne State University alumni
Atlantic Records artists
Blue Note Records artists
Epic Records artists
Impulse! Records artists
Prestige Records artists
Savoy Records artists
Timeless Records artists